Coroados is a municipality located in the Brazilian state of São Paulo. The name "Coroados" refers to the Kaingang people, the original inhabitants of the area.

References

Municipalities in São Paulo (state)